Ballard Smith was a soldier and congressman from Virginia.

Biography
Smith was born in Hanover County, Virginia. In the Revolutionary War, he rose to the now-defunct rank of captain lieutenant in the 1st Virginia Regiment of the Continental Army. In the 1790s, he rose to the rank of major in the United States Army.

He was a member of the Virginia House of Delegates from 1810 to 1813 and was later elected a Democratic-Republican to the United States House of Representatives in 1814, serving from 1815 to 1821. Afterwards, Smith returned to the House of Delegates in 1824, serving again until 1826 and again in 1836 and 1837.

Electoral history

1815; Smith was elected to the U.S. House of Representatives, defeating Federalist John Mathews.
1817; Smith was re-elected unopposed.
1819; Smith was re-elected unopposed.

References
 Retrieved on 2009-05-07
Service record from Francis B. Heitman's Historical Register of Officers of the Continental Army. Heitman says that the Lieutenant Ballard Smith who served in the Revolution died on 20 March 1794, i.e. before the subject of this article served in Congress. Heitman is in error or these are two different men.

Continental Army officers from Virginia
Members of the Virginia House of Delegates
Year of birth unknown
Year of death unknown
Democratic-Republican Party members of the United States House of Representatives from Virginia
People from Hanover County, Virginia
19th-century American politicians
People from Greenbrier County, West Virginia